The Chinese dragon, also known as the loong, long or lung ( / ), is a legendary creature in Chinese mythology, Chinese folklore, and Chinese culture at large. Chinese dragons have many animal-like forms such as turtles and fish, but are most commonly depicted as snake-like with four legs. Academicians have identified four reliable theories on the origin of the Chinese dragon: snakes, Chinese alligators, thunder and nature worship. They traditionally symbolize potent and auspicious powers, particularly control over water, rainfall, typhoons, and floods. The dragon is also a symbol of power, strength, and good luck for people who are worthy of it in East Asian culture. During the days of Imperial China, the Emperor of China usually used the dragon as a symbol of his imperial strength and power.
In Chinese culture, excellent and outstanding people are compared to a dragon, while incapable people with no achievements are compared to other, disesteemed creatures, such as a worm.

The impression of dragons in a large number of Asian countries has been influenced by Chinese culture, such as in Korea, Vietnam, and Japan. Chinese tradition has always used the dragon totem as the national emblem, and the "Yellow Dragon flag" of the Qing dynasty has influenced the impression that China is a dragon in many European countries. The white dragon of the flag of modern Bhutan is a classic Chinese-style dragon.

Symbolic value 

Historically, the Chinese dragon was associated with the Emperor of China and used as a symbol to represent imperial power. The founder of the Han dynasty Liu Bang claimed that he was conceived after his mother dreamt of a dragon. During the Tang dynasty, Emperors wore robes with dragon motif as an imperial symbol, and high officials might also be presented with dragon robes. In the Yuan dynasty, the two-horned five-clawed dragon was designated for use by the Son of Heaven or Emperor only, while the four-clawed dragon was used by the princes and nobles. Similarly during the Ming and Qing dynasty, the five-clawed dragon was strictly reserved for use by the Emperor only. The dragon in the Qing dynasty appeared on the first Chinese national flag.

The image of the Chinese dragon was roughly established in the Shang and Zhou dynasties, but there was no great change for a long time. In the Han Dynasty, the winged Yinglong, as a symbol of feudal imperial power, frequently appeared in Royal Dragon vessels, which means that most of the dragon image designs used by the royal family in the Han Dynasty are Yinglong patterns.Yinglong is a winged dragon in ancient Chinese legend. At present, the literature records of Yinglong's winged image can be tested from "Guangya" during the Three Kingdoms period, but Yinglong's winged design has been found in bronze ware from the Shang and Zhou Dynasties to stone carvings, silk paintings and lacquerware of the Han Dynasty. The literature records of Yinglong can be traced back to the documents of the pre-Qin period, such as Classic of Mountains and Seas and Chuci. According to the records in Classic of Mountains and Seas, the Chinese mythology 2200 years ago, Yinglong had the main characteristics of later Chinese dragons – the power to control the sky and the noble mythical status.

However, since the Tang and Song Dynasties, the image of the real dragon symbolizing China's imperial power was no longer the Yinglong with wings, but the common wingless Yellow Dragon in modern times. For the evolution of Yinglong and Yellow Dragon, scholar Chen Zheng proposed in "Yinglong – the origin of the image of the real dragon" that from the middle of the Zhou Dynasty, Yinglong's wings gradually became the form of flame pattern and cloud pattern at the dragon's shoulder in artistic creation, which derived the wingeless long snake shape. The image of Huanglong was used together with the winged Yinglong. Since then, with a series of wars, Chinese civilization suffered heavy losses, resulting in the forgetting of the image of winged Yinglong, and the image of wingless Yellow Dragon replaced the original Yinglong and became the real dragon symbolizing China's imperial power. On this basis, scholar Xiao Congrong put forward that the simplified artistic creation of Yinglong's wings by Chinese ancestors is a continuous process, that is, the simplification of dragon's wings is an irreversible trend. Xiao Congrong believes that the phenomenon of "Yellow Dragon" replacing "Ying Long" can not be avoided regardless of whether Chinese civilization has suffered disaster or not.

The dragon is sometimes used in the West as a national emblem of China though such use is not commonly seen in the People's Republic of China or the Republic of China. Instead, it is generally used as the symbol of culture. In Hong Kong, the dragon was a component of the coat of arms under British rule. It was later to become a feature of the design of Brand Hong Kong, a government promotional symbol.

The Chinese dragon has very different connotations from the European dragon – in European cultures, the dragon is a fire-breathing creature with aggressive connotations, whereas the Chinese dragon is a spiritual and cultural symbol that represents prosperity and good luck, as well as a rain deity that fosters harmony. It was reported that the Chinese government decided against using the dragon as its official 2008 Summer Olympics mascot because of the aggressive connotations that dragons have outside of China, and chose more "friendly" symbols instead.
Sometimes Chinese people use the term "Descendants of the Dragon" as a sign of ethnic identity, as part of a trend started in the 1970s when different Asian nationalities were looking for animal symbols as representations, for example, the wolf may be used by the Mongols as it is considered to be their legendary ancestor.

As a state symbol 

The dragon was the symbol of the Chinese emperor for many dynasties. During the Qing dynasty, the Azure Dragon was featured on the first Chinese national flag. It was featured again on the Twelve Symbols national emblem, which was used during the Republic of China, from 1913 to 1928.

Due to influences by Chinese culture, the dragon was also adopted as state symbol in Vietnam. During the Nguyễn dynasty, the dragon was featured on the imperial standards. It was also featured on the coats of arms of the State of Vietnam, and later South Vietnam.

Dragon worship

Origin 
The ancient Chinese self-identified as "the gods of the dragon" because the Chinese dragon is an imagined reptile that represents evolution from the ancestors and qi energy. Dragon-like motifs of a zoomorphic composition in reddish-brown stone have been found at the Chahai site (Liaoning) in the Xinglongwa culture (6200–5400 BC).
The presence of dragons within Chinese culture dates back several thousands of years with the discovery of a dragon statue dating back to the fifth millennium BC from the Yangshao culture in Henan in 1987, and jade badges of rank in coiled form have been excavated from the Hongshan culture circa 4700–2900 BC. Some of the earliest Dragon artifacts are the pig dragon carvings from the Hongshan culture.

The coiled dragon or snake form played an important role in early Chinese culture. The character for "dragon" in the earliest Chinese writing has a similar coiled form, as do later jade dragon amulets from the Shang period.

Ancient Chinese referred to unearthed dinosaur bones as dragon bones and documented them as such. For example, Chang Qu in 300 BC documents the discovery of "dragon bones" in Sichuan.

The binomial name for a variety of dinosaurs discovered in China, Mei long, in Chinese ( and ) means 'sleeping dragon'. Fossilized remains of Mei long have been found in China in a sleeping and coiled form, with the dinosaur nestling its snout beneath one of its forelimbs while encircling its tail around its entire body.

Mythical creature 

From its origins as totems or the stylized depiction of natural creatures, the Chinese dragon evolved to become a mythical animal. The Han dynasty scholar Wang Fu recorded Chinese myths that long dragons had nine anatomical resemblances.The people paint the dragon's shape with a horse's head and a snake's tail. Further, there are expressions as 'three joints' and 'nine resemblances' (of the dragon), to wit: from head to shoulder, from shoulder to breast, from breast to tail. These are the joints; as to the nine resemblances, they are the following: his antlers resemble those of a stag, his head that of a camel, his eyes those of a demon, his neck that of a snake, his belly that of a clam (shen), his scales those of a carp, his claws those of an eagle, his soles those of a tiger, his ears those of a cow. Upon his head he has a thing like a broad eminence (a big lump), called [chimu]. If a dragon has no [chimu], he cannot ascend to the sky.

Further sources give variant lists of the nine animal resemblances. Sinologist  lists these characteristics of an authentic dragon: "The antlers of a deer. The head of a crocodile. A demon's eyes. The neck of a snake. A tortoise's viscera. A hawk's claws. The palms of a tiger. A cow's ears. And it hears through its horns, its ears being deprived of all power of hearing". He notes that, "Others state it has a rabbit's eyes, a frog's belly, a carp's scales".

Chinese dragons were considered to be physically concise. Of the 117 scales, 81 are of the yang essence (positive) while 36 are of the yin essence (negative). Initially, the dragon was benevolent, wise, and just, but the Buddhists introduced the concept of malevolent influence among some dragons. Just as water destroys, they said, so can some dragons destroy via floods, tidal waves, and storms. They suggested that some of the worst floods were believed to have been the result of a mortal upsetting a dragon.

Many pictures of Chinese dragons show a flaming pearl under their chin or in their claws. The pearl is associated with spiritual energy, wisdom, prosperity, power, immortality, thunder, or the moon. Chinese art often depicts a pair of dragons chasing or fighting over the flaming pearl.

Chinese dragons are occasionally depicted with bat-like wings growing out of the front limbs, but most do not have wings, as their ability to fly (and control rain/water, etc.) is mystical and not seen as a result of their physical attributes.

This description accords with the artistic depictions of the dragon down to the present day. The dragon has also acquired an almost unlimited range of supernatural powers. It is said to be able to disguise itself as a silkworm, or become as large as our entire universe. It can fly among the clouds or hide in water (according to the Guanzi). It can form clouds, can turn into water, can change color as an ability to blend in with their surroundings, as an effective form of camouflage or glow in the dark (according to the Shuowen Jiezi).

In many other countries, folktales speak of the dragon having all the attributes of the other 11 creatures of the zodiac, this includes the whiskers of the Rat, the face and horns of the Ox, the claws and teeth of the Tiger, the belly of the Rabbit, the body of the Snake, the legs of the Horse, the goatee of the Goat, the wit of the Monkey, the crest of the Rooster, the ears of the Dog, and the snout of the Pig.

In some circles, it is considered bad luck to depict a dragon facing downwards, as it is seen as disrespectful to place a dragon in such manner that it cannot ascend to the sky. Also, depictions of dragons in tattoos are prevalent as they are symbols of strength and power, especially criminal organisations where dragons hold a meaning all on their own. As such, it is believed that one must be fierce and strong enough, hence earning the right to wear the dragon on his skin, lest his luck be consumed by the dragons.

According to an art historian John Boardman, depictions of Chinese Dragon and Indian Makara might have been influenced by Kētos in Greek Mythology possibly after contact with silk-road images of the Kētos as Chinese dragon appeared more reptilian and shifted head-shape afterwards.

Ruler of weather and water 

Chinese dragons are strongly associated with water and weather in popular religion. They are believed to be the rulers of moving bodies of water, such as waterfalls, rivers, or seas. The Dragon God is the dispenser of rain as well as the zoomorphic representation of the yang masculine power of generation. In this capacity as the rulers of water and weather, the dragon is more anthropomorphic in form, often depicted as a humanoid, dressed in a king's costume, but with a dragon head wearing a king's headdress.

There are four major Dragon Kings, representing each of the Four Seas: the East Sea (corresponding to the East China Sea), the South Sea (corresponding to the South China Sea), the West Sea (sometimes seen as the Qinghai Lake and beyond), and the North Sea (sometimes seen as Lake Baikal).

Because of this association, they are seen as "in charge" of water-related weather phenomena. In premodern times, many Chinese villages (especially those close to rivers and seas) had temples dedicated to their local "dragon king". In times of drought or flooding, it was customary for the local gentry and government officials to lead the community in offering sacrifices and conducting other religious rites to appease the dragon, either to ask for rain or a cessation thereof.

The King of Wuyue in the Five Dynasties and Ten Kingdoms period was often known as the "Dragon King" or the "Sea Dragon King" because of his extensive hydro-engineering schemes which "tamed" the sea.

In coastal regions of China, Korea, Vietnam, traditional legends and worshipping of whales (whale gods) as the guardians of people on the sea have been referred to Dragon Kings after the arrival of Buddhism.

Symbol of imperial authority 

According to Chinese legend, both Chinese primogenitors, the earliest Door and the Yellow Emperor (Huangdi), were closely related to 'Long' (Chinese dragon). At the end of his reign, the first legendary ruler, the Yellow Emperor, was said to have been immortalized into a dragon that resembled his emblem, and ascended to Heaven. The other legendary ruler, the Yan Emperor, was born by his mother's telepathy with a mythical dragon. Since the Chinese consider the Yellow Emperor and the Yan Emperor as their ancestors, they sometimes refer to themselves as "the descendants of the dragon". This legend also contributed towards the use of the Chinese dragon as a symbol of imperial power.

Dragons (usually with five claws on each foot) were a symbol for the emperor in many Chinese dynasties. During the Qing dynasty, the imperial dragon was colored yellow or gold, and during the Ming dynasty it was red. The imperial throne was referred to as the Dragon Throne. During the late Qing dynasty, the dragon was even adopted as the national flag. Dragons are featured in carvings on the stairs and walkways of imperial palaces and imperial tombs, such as at the Forbidden City in Beijing.

In some Chinese legends, an emperor might be born with a birthmark in the shape of a dragon. For example, one legend tells the tale of a peasant born with a dragon birthmark who eventually overthrows the existing dynasty and founds a new one; another legend might tell of the prince in hiding from his enemies who is identified by his dragon birthmark.

In contrast, the Empress of China was often identified with the Chinese phoenix.

Modern belief 
Worship of the Dragon God is celebrated throughout China with sacrifices and processions during the fifth and sixth moons, and especially on the date of his birthday the thirteenth day of the sixth moon. A folk religious movement of associations of good-doing in modern Hebei is primarily devoted to a generic Dragon God whose icon is a tablet with his name inscribed, for which it has been named the "movement of the Dragon Tablet".

Depictions of the dragon

Neolithic depictions 
Dragons or dragon-like depictions have been found extensively in neolithic-period archaeological sites throughout China. Some of earliest depictions of dragons were found at Xinglongwa culture sites. Yangshao culture sites in Xi'an have produced clay pots with dragon motifs. A burial site Xishuipo in Puyang which is associated with the Yangshao culture shows a large dragon mosaic made out of clam shells. The Liangzhu culture also produced dragon-like patterns. The Hongshan culture sites in present-day Inner Mongolia produced jade dragon objects in the form of pig dragons which are the first 3-dimensional representations of Chinese dragons.

One such early form was the pig dragon. It is a coiled, elongated creature with a head resembling a boar. The character for "dragon" in the earliest Chinese writing has a similar coiled form, as do later jade dragon amulets from the Shang dynasty. A snake-like dragon body painted on red pottery wares was discovered at Taosi (Shanxi) from the second phase of the Longshan Culture, and a dragon-like object coated with approximately 2000 pieces of turquoise and jade was discovered at Erlitou.

Classical depictions 

Chinese literature and myths refer to many dragons besides the famous long. The linguist Michael Carr analyzed over 100 ancient dragon names attested in Chinese classic texts. Many such Chinese names derive from the suffix -long:
Tianlong, celestial dragon that guards heavenly palaces and pulls divine chariots; also a name for the constellation Draco
Shenlong, thunder god that controls the weather, appearance of a human head, dragon's body, and drum-like stomach
Fuzanglong, underworld guardian of precious metals and jewels, associated with volcanoes
Dilong, controller of rivers and seas; also a name for earthworm
Yinglong, winged dragon associated with rains and floods, used by Yellow Emperor to kill Chi You
Jiaolong, hornless or scaled dragon, leader of all aquatic animals
Panlong, lake dragon that has not ascended to heaven
Huanglong, hornless dragon symbolizing the emperor
Feilong, winged dragon that rides on clouds and mist; also a name for a genus of pterosaur (compare Feilong kick and Fei Long character)
Qinglong, the animal associated with the East in the Chinese Four Symbols, mythological creatures in the Chinese constellations
Qiulong, contradictorily defined as both "horned dragon" and "hornless dragon"
Zhulong or Zhuyin was a giant red draconic solar deity in Chinese mythology. It supposedly had a human's face and snake's body, created day and night by opening and closing its eyes, and created seasonal winds by breathing. (Note that this zhulong is different from the similarly named Vermilion Dragon or the Pig dragon).
Chilong, a hornless dragon or mountain demon
Fewer Chinese dragon names derive from the prefix long-:
Longwang divine rulers of the Four Seas
Longma, emerged from the Luo River and revealed ba gua to Fu Xi

Some additional Chinese dragons are not named with long , for instance,
Hong, a two-headed dragon or rainbow serpent
Shen, a shapeshifting dragon or sea monster believed to create mirages
Bashe was a giant python-like dragon that ate elephants
Teng or Tengshe (lit. "soaring snake") is a flying dragon without legs

Chinese scholars have classified dragons in diverse systems. For instance, Emperor Huizong of the Song dynasty canonized five colored dragons as "kings".
The Azure Dragon [Qinglong ] spirits, most compassionate kings.
The Vermilion Dragon [Zhulong  or Chilong ] spirits, kings that bestow blessings on lakes.
The Yellow Dragon [Huanglong ] spirits, kings that favorably hear all petitions.
The White Dragon [Bailong ] spirits, virtuous and pure kings.
The Black Dragon [Xuanlong  or Heilong ] spirits, kings dwelling in the depths of the mystic waters.
With the addition of the Yellow Dragon of the center to Azure Dragon of the East, these Vermilion, White, and Black Dragons coordinate with the Four Symbols, including the Vermilion Bird of the South, White Tiger of the West, and Black Tortoise of the North.

Nine sons of the dragon 

Several Ming dynasty texts list what were claimed as the Nine Offspring of the Dragon, and subsequently these feature prominently in popular Chinese stories and writings. The scholar  (1567–1624) in his work Wu Za Zu  (c. 1592) gives the following listing, as rendered by M.W. de Visser:
A well-known work of the end of the sixteenth century, the Wuzazu , informs us about the nine different young of the dragon, whose shapes are used as ornaments according to their nature.
The [pú láo ], four leg small form dragon class which like to scream, are represented on the tops of bells, serving as handles.
The [qiú niú ], which like music, are used to adorn musical instruments.
The [chī wěn ], which like swallowing, are placed on both ends of the ridgepoles of roofs (to swallow all evil influences).
The [cháo fēng ], beasts-like dragon which like adventure, are placed on the four corners of roofs.
The [yá zì ], which like to kill, are engraved on sword guards.
The [xì xì ], which have the shape of the [chī hǔ  (One kind small form dragon)], and are fond of literature, are represented on the sides of grave-monuments.
The [bì àn ], which like litigation, are placed over prison gates (in order to keep guard).
The [suān ní ], which like to sit down, are represented upon the bases of Buddhist idols (under the Buddhas' or Bodhisattvas' feet).
The [bì xì ], also known as [bà xià ], finally, big tortoises which like to carry heavy objects, are placed under grave-monuments.

Further, the same author enumerates nine other kinds of dragons, which are represented as ornaments of different objects or buildings according to their liking prisons, water, the rank smell of newly caught fish or newly killed meat, wind and rain, ornaments, smoke, shutting the mouth (used for adorning key-holes), standing on steep places (placed on roofs), and fire.

The Sheng'an waiji collection by the poet Yang Shen (1488–1559) gives different 5th and 9th names for the dragon's nine children: the tāo tiè, form of beasts, which loves to eat and is found on food-related wares, and the jiāo tú, which looks like a conch or clam, does not like to be disturbed, and is used on the front door or the doorstep. Yang's list is bì xì, chī wěn or cháo fēng, pú láo, bì àn, tāo tiè, qiú niú, yá zì, suān ní, and jiāo tú. In addition, there are some sayings including [bā xià ], Hybrid of reptilia animal and dragon, a creature that likes to drink water, and is typically used on bridge structures.

The oldest known attestation of the "children of the dragon" list is found in the Shuyuan zaji (Miscellaneous records from the bean garden) by Lu Rong (1436–1494); however, he noted that the list enumerates mere synonyms of various antiques, not children of a dragon. The nine sons of the dragon were commemorated by the Shanghai Mint in 2012's year of the dragon with two sets of coins, one in silver, and one in brass. Each coin in the sets depicts one of the 9 sons, including an additional coin for the father dragon, which depicts the nine sons on the reverse. It's also a Chinese idiom, which means among brothers each one has his good points.

Dragon claws 

Early Chinese dragons are depicted with two to five claws. Different countries that adopted the Chinese dragon have different preferences; in Mongolia and Korea, four-clawed dragons are used, while in Japan, three-clawed dragons are common. In China, three-clawed dragons were popularly used on robes during the Tang dynasty. The usage of the dragon motif was codified during the Yuan dynasty, and the five-clawed dragons became reserved for use by the emperor while the princes used four-clawed dragons.  Phoenixes and five-clawed two-horned dragons may not be used on the robes of officials and other objects such as plates and vessels in the Yuan dynasty. It was further stipulated that for commoners, "it is forbidden to wear any cloth with patterns of Qilin, Male Fenghuang (Chinese phoenix), White rabbit, Lingzhi, Five-Toe Two-Horn Dragon, Eight Dragons, Nine Dragons, 'Ten thousand years', Fortune-longevity character and Golden Yellow etc."

The Hongwu Emperor of the Ming dynasty emulated the Yuan dynasty rules on the use of the dragon motif and decreed that the dragon would be his emblem and that it should have five claws. The four-clawed dragon would be used typically for imperial nobility and certain high-ranking officials. The three-clawed dragon was used by lower ranks and the general public (widely seen on various Chinese goods in the Ming dynasty). The dragon, however, was only for select royalty closely associated with the imperial family, usually in various symbolic colors, while it was a capital offense for anyone—other than the emperor himself—to ever use the completely gold-colored, five-clawed Long dragon motif. Improper use of claw number or colors was considered treason, punishable by execution of the offender's entire clan. During the Qing dynasty, the Manchus initially considered three-clawed dragons the most sacred and used that until 1712 when it was replaced by five-clawed dragons, and portraits of the Qing emperors were usually depicted with five-clawed dragons.

In works of art that left the imperial collection, either as gifts or through pilfering by court eunuchs (a long-standing problem), where practicable, one claw was removed from each set, as in several pieces of carved lacquerware, for example the well known Chinese lacquerware table in the Victoria and Albert Museum in London.

Cultural references

Number nine 

The number nine is special in China as it is seen as number of heaven, and Chinese dragons are frequently connected with it. For example, a Chinese dragon is normally described in terms of nine attributes and usually has 117 (9×13) scales—81 (9×9) Yang and 36 (9×4) Yin.
This is also why there are nine forms of the dragon and nine sons of the dragon (see Classical depictions above). The Nine-Dragon Wall is a spirit wall with images of nine different dragons, and is found in imperial Chinese palaces and gardens. Because nine was considered the number of the emperor, only the most senior officials were allowed to wear nine dragons on their robes—and then only with the robe completely covered with surcoats. Lower-ranking officials had eight or five dragons on their robes, again covered with surcoats; even the emperor himself wore his dragon robe with one of its nine dragons hidden from view.

There are a number of places in China called "Nine Dragons", the most famous being Kowloon (in Cantonese) in Hong Kong. The part of the Mekong in Vietnam is known as Cửu Long, with the same meaning.

Chinese zodiac 

The Dragon is one of the 12 animals in the Chinese zodiac which is used to designate years in the Chinese calendar. It is thought that each animal is associated with certain personality traits. Dragon years are usually the most popular to have children. There are more people born in Dragon years than in any other animal years of the zodiac.

Constellations 

The Azure Dragon (Qing Long) is considered to be the primary of the four celestial guardians, the other three being the Zhu Que (Vermilion Bird), Bai Hu (White Tiger), Xuan Wu (Black Tortoise-like creature). In this context, the Azure Dragon is associated with the East and the element of Wood.

Dragonboat racing 

At special festivals, especially the Duanwu Festival, dragon boat races are an important part of festivities. Typically, these are boats paddled by a team of up to 20 paddlers with a drummer and steersman. The boats have a carved dragon as the head and tail of the boat. Dragon boat racing is also an important part of celebrations outside of China, such as at Chinese New Year. A similar racing is popular in India in the state of Kerala called Vallamkali and there are records on Chinese traders visiting the seashores of Kerala centuries back (Ibn Batuta).

Dragon dancing 

On auspicious occasions, including Chinese New Year and the opening of shops and residences, festivities often include dancing with dragon puppets. These are "life sized" cloth-and-wood puppets manipulated by a team of people, supporting the dragon with poles. They perform choreographed moves to the accompaniment of drums, drama, and music. They also wore good clothing made of silk.

Dragon and Fenghuang 

Fenghuang, known in Japanese as Hō-ō or Hou-ou, are phoenix-like birds found in East Asian mythology that reign over all other birds. In Chinese symbolism, it is a feminine entity that is paired with the masculine Chinese dragon, as a visual metaphor of a balanced and blissful relationship, symbolic of both a happy marriage and a regent's long reign.

Dragon as nāga 

In many Buddhist countries, the concept of the nāga has been merged with local traditions of great and wise serpents or dragons, as depicted in this stairway image of a multi-headed nāga emerging from the mouth of a Makara in the style of a Chinese dragon at Phra Maha Chedi Chai Mongkol on the premises of Wat Pha Namthip Thep Prasit Vararam in Thailand's Roi Et Province Nong Phok District.

Dragons and tigers 
The tiger is considered to be the eternal rival to the dragon, thus various artworks depict a dragon and tiger fighting an epic battle. A well used Chinese idiom to describe equal rivals (often in sports nowadays) is "Dragon versus Tiger". In Chinese martial arts, "Dragon style" is used to describe styles of fighting based more on understanding movement, while "Tiger style" is based on brute strength and memorization of techniques.

Dragons and botany 

The elm cultivar Ulmus pumila 'Pendula', from northern China, called 'weeping Chinese elm' in the West, is known locally as Lung chao yü shu ('Dragon's-claw elm') owing to its branching.

Language 
A number of Chinese proverbs and idioms feature references to a dragon, such as "Hoping one's child will become a dragon".

In popular culture 
 As a part of traditional folklore, dragons appear in a variety of mythological fiction. In the classical novel Journey to the West, the son of the Dragon King of the West was condemned to serve as a horse for the travelers because of his indiscretions at a party in the heavenly court. Sun Wukong's staff, the Ruyi Jingu Bang, was robbed from Ao Guang, the Dragon King of the East Sea. In Fengshen Yanyi and other stories, Nezha, the boy hero, defeats the Dragon Kings and tames the seas. Chinese dragons also appear in innumerable Japanese anime films and television shows, manga, and in Western political cartoons as a personification of the People's Republic of China. The Chinese respect for dragons is emphasized in Naomi Novik's Temeraire novels, where they were the first people to tame dragons and are treated as equals, intellectuals, or even royalty, rather than beasts solely bred for war in the West. Manda is a large Chinese dragon that appears in the Godzilla storyline. A golden three-headed dragon also appears in the comic book series God Is Dead.
 The red dragon is a symbol of China which appears in many Mahjong games.
 A Chinese water dragon cast by a rebel mermaid named Aurora is the main antagonist in Season 3 of the Australian television series Mako Mermaids. The dragon is heavily based on Chinese mythology to coincide with a new Chinese mermaid on the show.
 The main antagonist of Wendy Wu: Homecoming Warrior, Yan-Lo, is a Chinese dragon. Despite the fact that he is deceased during the events of the film, he continues to hatch evil plans in the form of a spirit.
 In Monster High, Jinafire Long is the daughter of a Chinese dragon.
 The 1982 Rankin/Bass Productions features a Chinese dragon being the steed for Lo Tae Zhao, the Golden Wizard whose realm is light and air.
 Eddie Murphy voices Mushu, a red Chinese dragon in the 1998 Disney animated film Mulan and its 2004 sequel, Mulan II.
 Chinese dragons heavily influenced the dragons, including Fang, on Avatar: The Legend of Aang and The Legend of Korra. 
 In the Marvel Cinematic Universe film Shang-Chi and the Legend of the Ten Rings, the Great Protector is a Chinese water dragon that protects the realm of Ta Lo. Statues of Chinese dragons were also featured in the throne room of Trevor Slattery, Aldrich Killian's pawn, when posing as the Mandarin; long before finding the real version, Shang Chi's father
 The iconic Mortal Kombat logo depicts a silhouette of a traditional Chinese dragon.
 "Eastern Dragons" are one of the four types of dragons in the game Shadowrun, along with Western Dragons, Leviathans, and Feathered Serpents.

Regional variations across Asia 

While depictions of the dragon in art and literature are consistent throughout the cultures in which it is found, there are some regional differences.

For more information on peculiarities in the depiction of the dragon in East Asian, South Asian, and Southeast Asian cultures, see:

Dragons related to the Chinese dragon
 Druk, the Thunder Dragon of Bhutanese mythology
 the Japanese dragon
 the Korean dragon
 Nāga, a Hindu and Buddhist creature in South Asian and Southeast Asian mythology.
 Bakunawa, a moon-eating sea dragon depicted in Philippine mythology.
 Pakhangba, a Manipuri dragon.
 the Vietnamese dragon

Dragons similar to the Chinese dragon
 Makara, a sea Dragon in Hindu and Buddhist mythology
 Yali, a legendary creature in Hindu mythology
 the Nepalese dragon as depicted with Bhairava, also known as the "flying snake"

Gallery

Architecture

Textile

Painting

Metalwork

Jade

Ceramics

Modern artwork

See also

References

Citations

Sources 

 
 
 
 
 
 , @University of Georgia Library

External links 

 

Dragons
Dragon
 
East Asian mythology
National symbols of China
Yangshao culture